Kenneth Okada (born February 22, 1950) is an American judoka. He competed in the men's lightweight event at the 1972 Summer Olympics.

References

External links
 

1950 births
Living people
American male judoka
Olympic judoka of the United States
Judoka at the 1972 Summer Olympics
Sportspeople from Los Angeles
20th-century American people
21st-century American people